Banco Santander, S.A., doing business as Santander Group, is a Spanish multinational financial services company based in Madrid and Santander in Spain. Additionally, Santander maintains a presence in all global financial centres as the 16th-largest banking institution in the world. Although known for its European banking operations, it has extended operations across North and South America, and more recently in continental Asia. It is considered a systemically important bank by Financial Stability Board.  

Many subsidiaries, such as Abbey National, have been rebranded under the Santander name. The company is a component of the Euro Stoxx 50 stock market index. In May 2016, Santander was ranked as 37th in the Forbes Global 2000 list of the world's biggest public companies. Santander is Spain's largest bank.

Banco Santander is chaired by Ana Patricia Botín-Sanz de Sautuola O'Shea, daughter and granddaughter of former chairmen Emilio Botin-Sanz de Sautuola y García de los Ríos and Emilio Botín-Sanz de Sautuola López, respectively.

History
Banco Santander was founded in 1857 as Banco de Santander. In 1999, it merged with Banco Central Hispano, or BCH, which had in turn been formed through the 1991 merger of Banco Central and Banco Hispanoamericano. The combined bank, known as Banco Santander Central Hispano, or BSCH, was designed to be a "merger of equals", in which the top executives of the two pre-existing firms would share control of the merged entity. Soon after the merger former BCH executives accused Banco Santander chairman Emilio Botín Sanz de Sautuola, and García de los Ríos who succeeded him, of trying to push his own agenda and threatened to take legal action. This post-merger disagreement was resolved when BCH executives Jose Amusátegui and Angel Corcóstegui agreed to accept severance payments, retire and pass control to Botín, at an expense to shareholders of €183 million. The large termination payouts generated negative press, and Botín was eventually brought to trial on criminal charges of "misappropriation of funds" and "irresponsible management". However, in April 2005, the court cleared him of all charges, the €164 million retirement payments made to the two former executives having been found to be legal, "made as compensation for the services provided to the bank". Also that year, the anti-corruption division of the Spanish public prosecutor's office cleared Botín of all charges in a separate case, in which he was accused of insider trading. In 2007, the bank officially changed the official name back to Banco Santander S.A.

In 1996, Banco Santander acquired Grupo Financiero InverMexico. In 2000, Banco Santander Central Hispano acquired Grupo Financiero Serfin of Mexico. On 26 July 2004, Banco Santander Central Hispano announced the acquisition of Abbey National plc. Following shareholders' approval at the EGM of Abbey (95 percent voted in favour, despite vocal opposition from most of those present) and Santander, the acquisition was formally approved by the courts and Abbey became part of the Santander Group on 12 November 2004. In June 2006, Banco Santander Central Hispano purchased almost 20% of Sovereign Bank and acquired the option to buy the bank (at the time, the market value was roughly US$40 per share) for one year beginning in the middle of 2008.

In May 2007, Banco Santander Central Hispano announced that in conjunction with The Royal Bank of Scotland and Fortis it would make an offer for ABN AMRO. BSCH's share of the offer added up to 28% and the offer would have to be made up of a capital increase through a new share issue. Then in October 2007, the consortium outbid Barclays and acquired ABN AMRO. As part of the deal, Grupo Santander acquired ABN AMRO's subsidiary in Brazil, Banco Real, and its subsidiary in Italy, Banca Antonveneta. On 13 August 2007, Banco Santander Central Hispano changed its legal name to Banco Santander. In November that year, it sold Banca Antonveneta to Banca Monte dei Paschi di Siena, excluding a subsidiary Interbanca. In March 2008,  Banco Santander sold Interbanca to GE Commercial Finance, receiving in return GE Money businesses in Germany, Finland and Austria, and GE's card and auto-financing businesses in the UK, which it integrated with Santander Consumer Finance.

In July 2008, the group announced it intended to purchase the UK bank Alliance & Leicester, which held £24 billion in deposits and had 254 branches. Santander also purchased the savings business of Bradford & Bingley in September 2008, which held deposits of £22 billion, 2.6 million customers, 197 branches and 140 agencies. The acquisition of Alliance & Leicester completed in October 2008 when the B&B's shares were delisted from the London Stock Exchange. By the end of 2010 the two banks merged with Abbey National under the Santander UK brand. In October 2008, the Group announced to acquire 75.65% of Sovereign Bancorp it did not own for approximately US$1.9 billion (€1.4 billion). Because of the 2008 financial crisis at the time, Sovereign's share price had fallen greatly: rather than the $40 per share it would have cost in 2006, Banco Santander ended up paying less than $3 per share.  The acquisition of Sovereign gave Santander its first retail bank in the mainland United States. Santander renamed the bank to enhance its global brand recognition in October 2013. On 14 December 2008, it was revealed that the collapse of Bernard Madoff's Ponzi scheme might mean the loss of €2.33 billion at Banco Santander.

On 10 November 2009, HSBC Finance Corporation announced its auto finance entities had reached an agreement with Santander Consumer USA Inc.(SC USA) to sell HSBC US auto loan servicing operations, US$1 billion in auto loan receivables for US$904 million in cash, and enter into a loan servicing agreement for the remainder of its liquidated US auto loan portfolio. The transaction closed in the first quarter of 2010.

In September 2010, Santander purchased Bank Zachodni WBK from Allied Irish Banks. On 28 February 2012, Santander announced that it had reached an agreement with KBC Bank to buy KBC's subsidiary Kredyt Bank in Poland. Santander merged Bank Zachodni WBK and Kredyt to create Poland's third-biggest bank, valued at about €5 billion (US$6.7 billion), having a market share of 9.6% in deposits, 8.0% in loans, 12.9% in branches (899), and more than 3.5 million retail customers. As a result of the merger, Santander came to hold 76.5% of the combined bank, and KBC came to hold about 16.4%; other shareholders held about 7.1% of the shares in the combined bank. Santander stated that it intended to buy more of KBC's shares in the combined bank to bring KBC's holdings below 10%; KBC affirmed it intended to sell its remaining stake. KBC sold its shareholding and Santander owns 75% of the bank, the rest is free float. In December 2012, Banco Santander announced that it would absorb Banesto and Banco BANIF, purchasing the remaining 10% of Banesto it did not already own.

In October 2013, Santander acquired 51% in Spain's largest consumer finance business, El Corte Inglés, for around €140 million. Santander acquired a €470 million stake in HSBC's Bank of Shanghai in 2013 in order to rebalance its business to the Asian market. In June 2014, Santander bought GE Money Bank, GE Capital's consumer finance business in Sweden, Norway and Denmark, for €700 million (US$950 million). In September 2014, it was announced that Santander was in talks to merge its asset management unit with that of Unicredit to create a European firm worth €350 billion in assets. In November 2014, Banco Santander acquired a 5.1 percent stake in Monitise Plc for £33 million. On 7 June 2017, Banco Santander purchased Banco Popular Español for a symbolic price of €1.

In 2018, the bank announced a three-year push into Latin America to increase its presence in the market, particularly Brazil and Mexico, targeting these countries' super-rich.

On July 13 and 14, 2019, the integration of the entire Banco Popular network was completed. This meant the definitive end of the Popular brand from a commercial point of view.

Dodge & Cox became Santander's second shareholder in an operation carried out on June 13, 2022. The US fund has a 3.038% stake in the bank. At the time of purchase, given the value of 2.64 euros per share, this stake was valued at 1,364 million euros.

Financial data

Operations

The Santander Group operates across Europe, South America, North America and Asia, partly due to its acquisitions.  it had more than 186,000 employees, 14,392 branches, 3.26 million shareholders and 102 million customers. Retail banking — the main aspect of Santander's operations — generates 74% of the group's profit.

On 10 June 2010, Grupo Santander announced that it would invest approximately US$270 million (€200 million) in Campinas, Brazil in a technology centre for research and data processing and a data centre that was to support operations across North America, Central America and South America. The new centre was to be established within the 'Development Company for High Technology Cluster of Campinas' on 1 million square metres. Construction began in January 2011, and full operation was expected in 2013 offering over 8,000 direct and indirect jobs.

In 2013, global growth equity firm General Atlantic, along with Warburg Pincus LLC, acquired a 50% stake in Santander Asset Management.

In 2010, Banco Santander expanded into China, focusing on trade finance services and establishing a joint venture with China Construction Bank. The venture was set up in 2011 with initial funds of 3.5 billion yuan (US$530 million).

Europe

Austria
 Santander Consumer Bank GmbH
Belgium
 Santander Consumer Finance Benelux B.V.
Denmark
 Santander Consumer Bank AS
Finland
 Santander Consumer Finance Oy
France
 Banco Santander, S.A. – Representative Office in Paris
Germany
 Santander Consumer Bank AG
 Santander Bank (Zweigniederlassung der Santander Consumer Bank AG)
 Santander Consumer Debit GmbH
 Santander Consumer Leasing GmbH
Italy
 Santander Consumer Bank S.p.A.
 Santander Private Banking
Luxembourg
 Banco Santander Totta S.A
Netherlands
 Santander Consumer Finance Benelux B.V.
Norway
 Santander Consumer Bank AS
Poland
 Santander Bank Polska
 Santander Consumer Bank S.A.
Portugal
 Banco Santander Totta
 Banco Popular Portugal
 Banco Santander Consumer Portugal, SA
 WiZink Portugal
 Hispamer
Spain
 Banco Santander
 Banco Popular Español
 Banco Pastor
 Santander Consumer Finance
 Openbank
 WiZink
Sweden
 Santander Consumer Bank AS
Switzerland
 Santander Private Banking
United Kingdom
 Santander UK
 Cahoot
 Cater Allen
Santander International
 Isle of Man branch
 Jersey branch
 Santander Consumer (UK) plc
 Santander Totta

Americas

Argentina
Banco Santander Río
Brazil
 Banco Santander Brasil
Canada
 Santander Consumer - Formerly CARFINCO - Based in Edmonton, Alberta, Canada
Chile
 Banco Santander-Chile
 Banco Santander Banefe
Colombia
 Banco Santander de Negocios Colombia S.A.
Mexico
 Santander México
Peru
 Banco Santander Perú S.A.
Puerto Rico
 Banco Santander Puerto Rico
 Santander Overseas Bank
United States
 Santander Private Banking
 Santander Bank
 Santander Consumer USA
 Santander Global Banking & Markets
 RoadLoans
 HelpingLoans
 TotalBank (Miami Dade)
Uruguay
 Banco Santander Uruguay

Asia and Australia

China
 Banco Santander, S.A. – Shanghai branch
 Banco Santander, S.A. – Beijing branch
Hong Kong
 Banco Santander, S.A. – Hong Kong branch
Singapore
 Banco Santander, S.A. – Singapore branch

Africa
 Attijariwafa Bank (4.55% share)

Sponsorships

Santander and La Liga had a title sponsorship deal from the 2016–17 season, forming the Spanish football league known commercially as La Liga Santander. Santander sponsored the UEFA Champions League for two years, from the 2018–19 season to 2020–21.

Santander has also sponsored the main South American club competition Copa Libertadores since 2008 for the South American markets.

In Formula One, from 2007 to 2017, Santander was a corporate sponsor of the Ferrari and McLaren teams. From 2022, Santander returned to Formula One as a premium sponsor of Ferrari.

In March 2020 Santander Group in conjunction with La Liga announced the first ever LaligaSantander Fest, a global charity concert event seeking to raise funds in response to the COVID-19 pandemic.

See also

 Inter-Alpha Group of Banks
List of banking institutions of Europe
 List of banks in Spain

Citations

References

Guillén, Mauro and Adrian Tschoegl (2008) Building a Global Bank: The Transformation of Banco Santander. (Princeton, NJ: Princeton University Press).

 
Banks of Spain
Conglomerate companies of Spain
Companies listed on the New York Stock Exchange
Multinational companies headquartered in Spain
Systemically important financial institutions
Companies based in Cantabria
Santander, Spain
Banks established in 1857
1857 establishments in Spain
Spanish brands
IBEX 35
Companies in the Euro Stoxx 50
Companies listed on the Madrid Stock Exchange
Companies listed on the London Stock Exchange
Companies listed on the Warsaw Stock Exchange
Banks under direct supervision of the European Central Bank